The 1922–23 City Cup was the twenty-fifth edition of the City Cup, a cup competition in Northern Irish football.

The tournament was won by Queen's Island for the 1st time.

Group standings

References

1922–23 in Northern Ireland association football